Harold James Hunter (born August 9, 1946) is a former utility infielder in Major League Baseball who played for the Boston Red Sox in part of three seasons spanning 1971–1975. Listed at 5' 10", 170 lb., Hunter batted and threw right-handed. 

The Red Sox selected Hunter in the third round, 61st pick of the 1969 MLB Draft out of the University of Nebraska. A dependable handyman, Hunter was used in pinch hitting, pinch running, DH, and late defensive replacement duties. He hit .294 (5-for-17) with five runs and two RBI in 22 career games, including two doubles and a .478 on-base percentage. In 12 infield appearances at second base (9) and third (3), he compiled a .969 fielding percentage while committing an error in 31 chances.

Following his career in the majors, Hunter played with Triple-A Pawtucket Red Sox (1978–1979) and later managed the Winston-Salem Red Sox (1980–1981).

Sources

Further reading
SABR BioProject

External links
, or Baseball Gauge, or Retrosheet, or Pelota Binaria (Venezuelan Winter League)

1947 births
Living people
Baseball players from Nebraska
Boston Red Sox players
Cardenales de Lara players
Leones del Caracas players
American expatriate baseball players in Venezuela
Louisville Colonels (minor league) players
Major League Baseball infielders
Minor league baseball managers
Nebraska Cornhuskers baseball players
Omaha Royals players
Pawtucket Red Sox players
Pittsfield Red Sox players
Rhode Island Red Sox players
Sportspeople from Omaha, Nebraska